Sandeid is a former municipality in Rogaland county, Norway.  The  municipality existed from 1923 until its dissolution in 1965.  It was located at the northern end of the Sandeidfjorden in what is now part of the municipality of Vindafjord.  The administrative centre of the municipality was the village of Sandeid where Sandeid Church is located.

History
The municipality was created on 1 January 1923 when the old municipality of Vikedal was split into three. Initially, Sandeid had a population of 558. On 1 January 1965 Sandeid municipality was dissolved based on recommendations from the Schei Committee.  It was merged with parts of the neighboring municipalities of Imsland, Vikedal, Vats, and Skjold to form the new municipality of Vindafjord. Prior to the merger, Sandeid had a population of 876.

Government
All municipalities in Norway, including Sandeid, are responsible for primary education (through 10th grade), outpatient health services, senior citizen services, unemployment and other social services, zoning, economic development, and municipal roads.  The municipality is governed by a municipal council of elected representatives, which in turn elects a mayor.

Municipal council
The municipal council  of Sandeid was made up of 13 representatives that were elected to four year terms.  The party breakdown of the final municipal council was as follows:

See also
List of former municipalities of Norway

References

Vindafjord
Former municipalities of Norway
1923 establishments in Norway
1965 disestablishments in Norway